Indonesia Institute of Islamic Dawah or LDII, is an independent social organization for study and research on Alqur'an and Alhadist. Dakwah is Arabic for religious proselytizing.

Indonesia Institute of Islamic Dawah, an independent civic organizations, official and legal follow the provisions of Law no. 8 1985 on Community Organisations, Article 9, paragraph (2), April 4, 1986 (State Gazette of 1986 number 24), including PP, and implementation. 18 in 1986 and Minister of Home Affairs Regulation No.. 5 1986 and other legal rules. LDII, have the Articles of Association and Bylaws, Work Program and Management from the Central level to village level. LDII already recorded in the Agency for National Unity and Community Protection Department of the Interior. LDII is a component part of the Indonesian Nation residing in the Republic of Indonesia Based on Pancasila and the Constitution 45.

Indonesia Institute of Islamic Dawah (LDII) established in accordance with the ideals of the pioneering scholars of the Muslims as a place to learn, practice and propagate Islamic teachings are based purely on the Alquran and Alhadith, the cultural background of the people of Indonesia, in the frame of State Unitary Republic of Indonesia based on Pancasila and the Constitution of the Republic of Indonesia in 1945.

LDII was founded in Surabaya, East Java, in 1972, but had its roots in 1941. LDII now has branches throughout Indonesia. LDII is viewed as a puritanical Islamic organization by the Indonesian Religion Department. The LDII requires its members not to touch the hands of the opposite sex who are not their mahram (mahram: a person whom you cannot mary) which is in accordance with several shahih hadiths. Women must cover themselves completely except for the face, hands, and feet. They also have to lengthen the headscarf/hijab to cover the chest.

History and Establishment of LDII 
Indonesia Institute of Islamic Dawah was first established on 3 January 1972 with the name of Islam Employee Foundation/Yayasan Lembaga Karyawan Islam (YAKARI). At Large Council in 1981, it was renamed to Institute of Islamic Employees/Lembaga Karyawan Islam (LEMKARI), and at the congress of 1990, based on Mr Sudarmono, SH speech briefing as Vice President and General Mr. Rudini as Minister of Home Affairs at that time, and good input at the meeting of plenary session of the commission and the trial in the Great Council LEMKARI IV in 1990, later the changes of name was specified in the decision MUBES LEMKARI No. IV. VI / MUBES-IV / LEMKARI/1990, article no. 3, which changing the name of the organization from Institute of Islamic Da'wah Employees, abbreviated as LEMKARI is accidentally the same as acronym of LEMKARI (Institute of Karate-Do Indonesia), converted into Indonesian Institute of Islamic Dawah (Lembaga Dawah Islam Indonesia), which is abbreviated as LDII.

Legal LDII as CBOs 
a). Essentially, the Minister of Justice and Human Rights Republic of. AHU-18. AH.01.06. Years. 2008, the date, February 20, 2008.
b). Contents Decision:
FIRST: Gives Endorsement Deed: Islamic Propagation Institute INDONESIA abbreviated LDII, TIN. 02.414.788.6-036.000 domiciled in the Capital of the Republic of Indonesia, as their statutes contained in the Deed No. 01 dated January 3, 1972 made by Notary Mudijomo based in Surabaya and Act No. 13 of the 27 September 2007, made before Notary Gunawan Wibisono, SH, based in Surabaya, and therefore recognizes the institution as a legal entity on the day of the announcement of its articles in the Supplement to the Republic of Indonesia.
SECOND: The decision of the Minister of Justice and Human Rights Republic of Indonesia submitted to the concerned to be known and implemented properly.

Motto LDII
There are 3 LDII motto:

Objectives  LDII 
As per the Articles of Association Article 5 Paragraph 2, LDII aims to improve the quality of life of society, nation and state is Islamic, and participate fully in the development of Indonesian society, which is based on faith and devotion to God Almighty in order to realize a democratic civil society and justice based social Pancasila, which is blessed by Allah Subhaanahu Wa Ta'alaa.

Organization  LDII 
Based on Article 12 Statutes LDII, LDII Organizational Structure consists of:

 DPP = Legislative Center, located in Jakarta.
 DPW = Provincial Representative Council of the Province, located in 33 provinces in Indonesia.
 City Council / Kabupaten = Regional Representatives Council City / County, located in the City or District of the Province of DPW levels above it.
 PC = Leadership Branch, located in District of the City Council / County on it.
 PAC = Leader Child Branch, located in the Village of the PCs on it.

Number of The Leadership LDII in Indonesia 
1. 33 DPW Province.

2. 302 District and the City Council.

3. 1637 PC (Head Branch) in the District.

4. 4500's PAC (Leader Child Branch) in the Village / Kelurahan.

Requirements to Become a Member LDII 
Based on the Articles of Association Article 10, the requirements to become a member of the Citizen LDII RI, who:

a. Belief in God Almighty,

b. Loyal to Pancasila and the Constitution 45,

c. Declared themselves voluntarily become members LDII,

d. Receive approved and able to adhere to the decision deliberations / meetings and the Regulations of the Organization,

e. Willing to follow all activities in accordance with the Work Program of the Organization.

Based Angaran Basic / Bylaws of the organization that actually LDII members consist of 2 (two) categories, namely Category I Members LDII; Yang as structural daily in the management of the kindergarten LDII Centre (national) Nor was the lowest level of the PAC (Village / Village). Members are elected by the citizens based on the result of deliberation. Then tenure during a period of 5 years. Stewardship can be selected again if already completed tenure. Category II Residents LDII: they are not members LDII, they usually consist of family members LDII, or Indonesian citizens who want to voluntarily learn studying the Koran and Hadith in LDII Organization. They were given voting rights in the organization.

Funding Sources LDII 
In the finance all sorts of activities according to the provisions of section 30 treatment organizations, LDII get funding from donations which are not binding. Most of the funds collected donations from residents LDII own (self-financing). Apart from its citizens, LDII also accepts donations in various forms from individuals, private parties and government of the Republic of Indonesia.

Controversies 
Upon its establishment, there are several controversy have been emerged related to LDII:

 A Jum'ah Khutbah document from JAIS mentioned that LDII is considered a deviant sect in which the teaching are contradicting the basic principles of Aqeedah Islamiyyah and Ahlush Sunnah Wal Jama'ah.
Muhammadiyah, once mentioned in their website that LDII is one of deviated sect. The reason of the statement is that LDII is a reincarnation of Islam Jamaah in which one of its core value is takfeer (deeming other Muslims other than their group as kafeer).

Schools
 

 Pondok Pesantren Millenium Alfina (East Java)
 Pondok Pesantren Minhaajurrosyidiin Jakarta (East Jakarta)

References

External links

 Official site
 FAQ about LDII
 Wakhid Sugiyarto, Kajian tentang Proses Santrinisasi
 LDII Sidoarjo|Lembaga Dakwah Islam Indonesia Kabupaten Sidoarjo Jawa Timur
 LDII Jember|Lembaga Dakwah Islam Indonesia Kabupaten Jember Jawa Timur
 Dakwah Online LDII 
 LDII Jatim 
 LDII Surabaya
 LDII Jabar 
 Information About LDII
 LDII Inside Story 
 DPW LDII Online
 LDII ku
 LDII Personal
 LDII Personal
 "AFTER NEW PARADIGM" - Notes about LDII Scholars (Lembaga Da'wah Islam Indonesia)
 Nuansa Persada
 Lantabur TV
 Antara News
 Official Web Site of President of the Republic of Indonesia - Dr. H. Susilo Bambang Yudhoyono
 Indonesia Institute of Islamic Dawah - Wikipedia Indonesian

Islamic organizations based in Indonesia
Islamism in Indonesia
Islamic organizations established in 1972